Raymundo Joseph Peña (February 19, 1934 – September 24, 2021) was an American prelate of the Roman Catholic Church.  He served as the bishop of the Diocese of Brownsville in Texas from 1995 to 2009, bishop of the Diocese of El Paso in Texas from 1980 to 1995 and auxiliary bishop of the Archdiocese of San Antonio in Texas from 1976 to 1980.

Biography

Early life 
Born in Corpus Christi, Texas on February 19, 1934, Raymundo Peña was the son of Cosme A. Peña and Elisa Ramon Peña. He attended both public and parochial schools in Robstown, Texas, then went to St. John's Seminary and Assumption Seminary, both in San Antonio, Texas.

Priesthood 
Peña was ordained to the priesthood for the Diocese of Corpus Christi on May 25, 1957, at Corpus Christi Cathedral by Bishop Mariano Garriaga.

Peña was named as diocesan youth director in 1970, holding the position until 1976. In 1969, Peña was also appointed pastor of Our Lady of Guadalupe Parish in Corpus Christi, serving there until 1976. He became editor of the Texas Gulf Coast Catholic  paper in 1970, along with vice-president of the Senate of Priests.

Auxiliary Bishop of San Antonio 
On October 16, 1976, Pope Paul VI named Peña as titular bishop of Trisipa and auxiliary bishop of the Archdiocese of San Antonio. He was consecrated at the Convention Center Arena in San Antonio on December 13, 1976, by Archdiocese Francis Furey.  

In 1977, Peña was named as vicar general for the archdiocese as well as executive director of the Office of the Laity.  In April 1979, after the death of Archbishop Francis  Furey, Peña served as administrator sede vacante for the archdiocese until the installation of Patrick Flores as archbishop later in 1979.

Bishop of El Paso 
On April 4, 1980, Pope John Paul II appointed Peña as Bishop of the Diocese of El Paso, He was installed on June 18, 1980.

Bishop of Brownsville 
On May 23, 1995, John Paul II appointed Peña as Bishop of the Diocese of Brownsville.  He was installed on August 6, 1995. 

On December 6, 2004, the Dallas Morning News published a report on how Peña handled accusations of sexual abuse against a foreign priest. Basil Onyia, a Nigerian priest, arrived in Diocese of Brownsville in 1999 and was assigned as assistant pastor of the Basilica of Our Lady of San Juan del Valle.  In January 2009, Peña received complaints from two women in the parish that Onyia was touching them inappropriately.  He told Onyia to stop it.  In April 2000, after a woman filed a police complaint, Peña transferred Onyia.  Later in 2000, two priests complained to Peña about Onyia's conduct.  In January 2001, Peña asks Onyia's bishop in Nigeria to recall him. In February 2001, the relatives of a developmentally disabled girl accused Onyia of rape.  Peña finally suspended Onyia, who fled to Nigeria to avoid arrest.

Resignation 
Peña submitted his letter of resignation as bishop of the Diocese of Brownsville to the Congregation for Bishops upon reaching 75. His resignation was accepted by Pope Benedict XVI on December 9, 2009.

Raymundo Peña died in San Juan, Texas on September 24, 2021, at age 87.

See also
 

 Catholic Church hierarchy
 Catholic Church in the United States
 Historical list of the Catholic bishops of the United States
 List of Catholic bishops of the United States
 Lists of patriarchs, archbishops, and bishops

References

External links
Roman Catholic Diocese of Brownsville

Episcopal succession

 

1934 births
2021 deaths
People from Corpus Christi, Texas
20th-century Roman Catholic bishops in the United States
21st-century Roman Catholic bishops in the United States
Roman Catholic bishops of El Paso